Australia competed at the 2017 Asian Indoor and Martial Arts Games held in Ashgabat, Turkmenistan from September 17 to 27. 17 athletes competed in 3 different sports.

Australia made its debut in an Asian Indoor and Martial Arts Games for the first time at the Games held in Turkmenistan along with other Oceania nations.

Participants

Medallists

References 

Nations at the 2017 Asian Indoor and Martial Arts Games
2017 in Australian sport